|}

The Knockaire Stakes is a Listed flat horse race in Ireland open to thoroughbreds aged three years or older. It is run at Leopardstown over a distance of 7 furlongs (1,408 metres), and it is scheduled to take place each year in October.

Records

Most successful horse (2 wins):
 Sovereign Debt – 2015, 2016

Leading jockey (4 wins):
 Kevin Manning – 	Free To Speak (1998), Just Special (2002), Bon Expresso (2003), Modeeroch (2006) 

Leading trainer (7 wins):
 Dermot Weld – Low Key Affair (1994), Nautical Pet (1995), Free To Speak (1998), Major Force (2000), Libano (2009), Enchanted Evening (2011), Making Light (2017)

Winners

See also
 Horse racing in Ireland
 List of Irish flat horse races

References
 Racing Post:

Flat races in Ireland
Open mile category horse races
Leopardstown Racecourse
1994 establishments in Ireland
Recurring sporting events established in 1994